Gabriel Patarai was a Georgian calligrapher of the 10th century.

He created his works at the Parkhali monastery of Tao-Klarjeti. His calligraphic works are written in the Nuskhuri script of the Georgian alphabet.

References

Calligraphers from Georgia (country)
10th-century people from Georgia (country)